Pasadena is the fourth studio album by American rock band Ozma, released in 2007.

Production
The album took five months to record and was mixed by Matt Hyde.

Critical reception
PopMatters wrote that the album is "more like Weezer's green self-titled album than anything, eager to live up to an ideal and doing a good job of it." The Los Angeles Times called the band "underrated," writing that the album is "more muscular and mature than the crunchy power-pop that gained Ozma a large Southland following over its first three albums." The Northern Express praised the "well-written, catchy indie compositions."

Track listing

Personnel
Daniel Brummel - vocals, bass

References

Ozma (band) albums
2007 albums